The  is a dam on the Tenryū River, located in Tenryū district, Hamamatsu city, Shizuoka Prefecture on the island of Honshū, Japan.

History
The potential of the Tenryū River valley for hydroelectric power development was realized by the Taishō period Japanese government in the early 20th century. The Tenryū River was characterized by a high volume of flow and a fast current. Its mountainous upper reaches and tributaries were areas of steep valleys and abundant rainfall, and were sparsely populated, and the Tenryū River’s propensity for flooding made flood control a priority. By the late 1960s, numerous dams had been constructed on the river’s upper and middle reaches and on several of its tributaries.

The Funagira Dam was the last major dam to be completed on the Tenryū River, and was built only 30 kilometers from the river mouth at the piedmont point of the river. Construction work began on the Funagira Dam in 1972 and was completed by 1977 by a consortium of the Kumagaya-gumi and Nishimatsu Construction.

Design
The Funagira Dam is a hollow-core concrete gravity dam with several central spillways. It supplies water to the nearby Funagira Hydroelectric Power Station, with a rated capacity of 32,000 kW.

Surroundings
The Funagira Dam Reservoir is a popular attraction for canoeing and camping, due to its proximity to downtown Hamamatsu.

See also

 List of dams and reservoirs in Japan

References
Japan Commission on Large Dams. Dams in Japan: Past, Present and Future. CRC Press (2009). 
photo page with data

Gravity dams
Dams in Shizuoka Prefecture
Hydroelectric power stations in Japan
Dams completed in 1977